The 2003 Women's European Volleyball Championship was the 23rd edition of the event, organised by Europe's governing volleyball body, the Confédération Européenne de Volleyball. It was hosted in Ankara, Turkey from 20 to 28 September 2003.

The two finalists Poland and Turkey claimed a ticket for the 2003 FIVB Women's World Cup and the first Olympic Qualification Tournament for the 2004 Summer Olympics held in Japan in November. The first six ranked teams (Poland, Turkey, Netherlands, Germany, Italy, and Russia) qualified for the European Olympic Qualification Tournament in Baku, from 5 to 10 January 2004. Semifinalists Turkey, Germany, Poland and the Netherlands also automatically qualified for the 2005 Women's European Championships, which took place in Croatia. Defending champion Russia finished out of the medals for the first time in volleyball history.

Participating teams

Format
The tournament was played in two different stages. In the first stage, the twelve participants were divided in two groups of six teams each. A single round-robin format was played within each group to determine the teams' group position. The second stage of the tournament consisted of two sets of semifinals to determine the tournament final ranking. The group stage firsts and seconds played the semifinals for 1st to 4th place, group stage thirds and fourths played the 5th to 8th place semifinals and the remaining four teams which finished group stages as fifth and sixth ended all tied in final ranking at 9th place. The pairing of the semifinals was made so teams played against the opposite group teams which finished in a different position (1st played against 2nd, 3rd played against 4th).

Pools composition

Squads

Venues

Preliminary round

 All times are Eastern European Summer Time (UTC+03:00).

Pool A
venue location: Ankara Atatürk Sport Hall, Ankara, Turkey

|}

 
|}

Pool B
venue location: Dilek Sabancı Sport Hall, Antalya, Turkey

|}

 
|}

Final round
venue location: Ankara Atatürk Sport Hall, Ankara, Turkey
 All times are Eastern European Summer Time (UTC+03:00).

5th–8th place
 Pools A and B third and fourth positions play each other.

5th–8th semifinals

|}

7th place match

|}

5th place match

|}

Final
 Pools A and B first and second positions play each other.

Semifinals

|}

3rd place match

|}

Final

|}

Final ranking

Poland and Turkey qualified for the 2003 FIVB Women's World Cup

Individual awards
Players awarded for their performances in the tournament.
Best Scorer: 
Best Spiker: 
Best Blocker: 
Best Server: 
Best Digger: 
Best Setter: 
Best Receiver:

References
 Confédération Européenne de Volleyball (CEV)

External links
 Results at todor66.com
 CEV Results
 Results

European Volleyball Championships
Volleyball Championship
European 2003
2003
Women's European Volleyball Championships
September 2003 sports events in Turkey
2000s in Ankara
Women's volleyball in Turkey
2003 in Turkish women's sport